Gaundare is a village in the Karmala taluka of Solapur district in Maharashtra state, India.

Demographics
Covering  and comprising 415 households at the time of the 2011 census of India, Gaundare had a population of 1848. There were 973 males and 875 females, with 282 people being aged six or younger.

References

Villages in Karmala taluka